The Shire of Warrnambool was a local government area located about  west-southwest of Melbourne, the state capital of Victoria, Australia.

Warrnambool itself was managed by a separate entity; the City of Warrnambool.

History

Warrnambool was first incorporated as a road district on 11 July 1854, and became a shire on 31 December 1863.

On 1 June 1985, the Borough of Koroit was merged into the Shire of Warrnambool, as an additional riding known as the Koroit Riding.

On 23 September 1994, the Shire of Warrnambool was abolished, and along with the Borough of Port Fairy, the Shires of Belfast and Minhamite, parts of the Shires of Dundas, Mortlake, Mount Rouse and the Tower Hill Reserve, was merged into the newly created Shire of Moyne.

Wards

The Shire of Warrnambool was divided into four ridings, each of which elected three councillors:
 North Riding
 South Riding
 East Riding
 Koroit Riding

Population

* Estimate in the 1958 Victorian Year Book.

References

External links
 Victorian Places - Warrnambool Shire

Warrnambool